Banca Intesa S.p.A. was an Italian banking group. It was formed in 1998. In the next year the banking group merged with another bank Banca Commerciale Italiana to become IntesaBCi. However, the name of the group was reverted to Banca Intesa in 2003. In 2007 Banca Intesa merged with another banking group Sanpaolo IMI to become Intesa Sanpaolo, one of few domestic systemically important bank of Italy.

History
Banca Intesa was formed in 1998 from the merger of Cassa di Risparmio delle Provincie Lombarde (Cariplo) and Banco Ambrosiano Veneto (former Nuovo Banco Ambrosiano and its predecessor Banco Ambrosiano, as well as Banca Cattolica del Veneto).

In 1999 Banca Commerciale Italiana entered the group, which pursuant to the merger in 2001 changed its name in IntesaBCi; on 1 January 2003, the group's name changed to Banca Intesa. The group also acquired many regional banks, such as Cariparma, FriulAdria (both sold to Crédit Agricole after 2007 merger), Carisap, Carifol, etc.

However, Intesa also sold some of them, for example Carispezia (to Banca CR Firenze in 2004), Cassa di Risparmio di Alessandria, Banca di Legnano (to Banca Popolare di Milano), Cassa di Risparmio di Carrara (to Banca Carige) and Banca Carime (to Banca Popolare Commercio e Industria in 2001). 20 branches was also sold to Banca Nuova, with additional 26 branches was sold to Banca Nuova's parent company Banca Popolare di Vicenza on 1 January 2001, for 250 billion lire, as well as 51 branches to Unipol Banca for 400 billion lire, as part of the response to the Italian Competition Authority investigation, on the monopoly of the bank after the merger with Banca Commerciale Italiana.

Crédit Agricole was the major shareholder of the group for 25.51% in circa before the merger of Intesa with BCI.

Banca Intesa and Sanpaolo IMI announced, in August 2006, that they will merge to found Italy's biggest and Europe's third largest banking group in terms of total assets.  The effective merger date is 1 January 2007 and adopts the name of "Intesa Sanpaolo S.p.A.".  The registered office of the new bank is in Turin and Milan shall remain as the secondary registered office.

On 1 January 2007, Sanpaolo IMI merged into Banca Intesa and name changed to Intesa Sanpaolo SpA.

Divisions

Banca Intesa S.p.A. focuses in four main business areas.
 The Retail Division serves individuals, small businesses, small and medium enterprises and non-profit organizations; its main activities include retail banking, wealth management, private banking and industrial credit.
 The Corporate Division serves mid and large corporates, financial institutions and public administrations; its main activities include mergers and acquisitions and structured finance services, merchant banking, capital market, global custody, and the specialized international network.
 The Italian Subsidiary Banks Division includes banking subsidiaries rooted in regional markets.
 The International Subsidiary Banks Division involves subsidiaries abroad, providing retail and commercial banking services mainly in Central-Eastern Europe. Banca Intesa has branches and representative offices in Europe, Asia, Latin and North America, and Africa.

Ownership
Prior the merger effective on 1 January 2007, the ownership ratio was as follow:
 Crédit Agricole 17.84%
 Fondazione Cariplo 9.22%
 Generali group (Assicurazioni Generali, Alleanza Assicurazioni and other subsidiaries) 7.54%
 Lombardo voting syndicate (Banca Lombarda e Piemontese, some shares are excluded from the voting syndicate) 4.88%
 Fondazione Cariparma 4.33%
 other shareholders 56.19%

Footnotes

References

External links
  (now redirect to Intesa Sanapolo's official website)

 
Defunct banks of Italy
Banks established in 1998
Italian companies established in 1998
Companies based in Milan
History of Intesa Sanpaolo
Companies formerly listed on the Borsa Italiana
Crédit Agricole
Banks disestablished in 2007
Italian companies disestablished in 2007